Sonoma County Sol was an American women's soccer team, founded in 2005. The team was a member of the Women's Premier Soccer League, the third tier of women's soccer in the United States and Canada. The team played in the North Division of the Pacific Conference. The team folded after the 2008 season.

The team played its home games at Ernie Nevers Field on the campus of Santa Rosa High School in the city of Santa Rosa, California, 55 miles north of San Francisco. The team's colors was blue and white.

The team was a sister organization of the men's Sonoma County Sol team, which plays in the National Premier Soccer League.

Players

Squad 2008

Notable former players
 Meagan McCray

Year-by-year

Honors

Competition history

Coaches
  Emiria Salzmann 2007–present

Stadia
 Ernie Nevers Field at Santa Rosa High School; Santa Rosa, California -present

Average attendance

External links
 Official Site
 WPSL Sonoma County Sol page

References

Women's Premier Soccer League teams
Women's soccer clubs in California
2005 establishments in California
2008 disestablishments in California
Association football clubs established in 2005
Association football clubs disestablished in 2008
Sports in Santa Rosa, California